Kathrine Brothmann Heindahl (born 26 March 1992) is a Danish handball player for Team Esbjerg and the Danish national team.

She made her debut on the Danish national team on 24 September 2010, against Turkey.

On 10 February 2020, it was announced that Heindahl had signed a 1-year contract with CSKA Moscow.

She participated at the 2016 European Women's Handball Championship in Sweden.

Achievements
Damehåndboldligaen:
Silver Medalist: 2013, 2018, 2020
Bronze Medalist: 2014, 2019
Danish Cup:
Winner: 2016
Finalist: 2018, 2019
EHF Cup:
Winner: 2013
Finalist: 2011

Individual awards
 Best Defender at the 2022 European Championship

References

External links

Danish female handball players
1992 births
Living people
People from Rudersdal Municipality
TTH Holstebro players
Expatriate handball players
Danish expatriate sportspeople in Russia
Sportspeople from the Capital Region of Denmark
21st-century Danish women